Sơn Hòa is a rural district (huyện) of Phú Yên province in the South Central Coastal region of Vietnam. As of 2003 the district had a population of 50,212. The district covers an area of 950 km². The district capital lies at Củng Sơn.

References

Districts of Phú Yên province